Iolanta Yevgenyevna Ulyeva (born 27 July 1976 in Karaganda) is a female shot putter from Kazakhstan. Her personal best throw is 17.82 metres, achieved in August 2000 in Almaty.

She finished eighth at the 2001 Summer Universiade and seventh at both the 2003 Asian Championships and the 2005 Asian Championships. In addition she competed at the World Championships in 2001 and 2003 and the Olympic Games in 2000m 2004 and 2008 without reaching the final. without reaching the final round.

Achievements

References

sports-reference

1976 births
Living people
Kazakhstani female shot putters
Athletes (track and field) at the 2000 Summer Olympics
Athletes (track and field) at the 2004 Summer Olympics
Athletes (track and field) at the 2008 Summer Olympics
Olympic athletes of Kazakhstan
Athletes (track and field) at the 2006 Asian Games
Asian Games competitors for Kazakhstan